The liberated Africans of Sierra Leone, also known as recaptives, were Africans who had been illegally enslaved onboard slave ships and rescued by anti-slavery patrols from the West Africa Squadron of the Royal Navy. After the British Parliament passed the Slave Trade Act 1807, which abolished Britain's involvement in the slave trade, the Admiralty established the West Africa Squadron to suppress the trade in cooperation with other Western powers. All illegally enslaved Africans liberated by the Royal Navy were taken to Freetown, where Admiralty courts legally confirmed their free status. Afterwards, they were consigned to a variety of unfree labor apprenticeships at the hands of the Nova Scotian Settlers and Jamaican Maroons in Sierra Leone. During the 19th century, it has been estimated by historians that roughly 80,000 illegally enslaved Africans were liberated by the Royal Navy.

Background
Shortly after the British Parliament outlawed British participation in the slave trade in 1807, the Royal Navy started to patrol the African coast and high seas, seizing British vessels suspected of engaging in the slave trade. After the Congress of Vienna and the ratification of various international agreements to restrict or outlaw the transatlantic trade, the West Africa Squadron, and to a lesser extent maritime patrols flying under the flags of Spain, Portugal, the Netherlands, Brazil, and the United States, also intercepted ships suspected of trafficking slaves in contravention of treaty provisions. In addition to the courts established in Freetown, tribunals to judge ships seized by anti-slaving patrols also operated in Havana, Rio de Janeiro, Luanda, Cape Verde, and St. Helena.

More than 80,000 Africans rescued from the illegal trade between Africa and the Americas were emancipated before courts operating in Freetown between 1808 and 1871, when the last remaining mixed commission was shuttered. Upon emancipation, most liberated Africans were registered with a Christian name, but a large number of registries also listed African names, based on information given by the liberated African or a translator. Many registries also record estimated age, height, brands, and body modifications.

The liberated Africans came from all over West Africa and some Central African countries. A significant portion of the recaptives settled in Freetown were Akan, Yoruba, Igbo and Hausa.

Life in Sierra Leone 
Though historians have noted that information on the day-to-day lives of the liberated Africans living in Sierra Leone is scarce, registers of Africans liberated by the British, letters written to the governor of Sierra Leone and other sources have allowed modern historians to reconstruct the daily lives of liberated Africans.

In the registers kept by the British, many of the African names were changed to European ones, highlighting the transition to their new circumstances in a British colony. The liberated Africans were also consigned by the colonial government to a variety of unfree labor apprenticeships in Freetown and the interior.

Liberated African villages
A number of villages were established to provide accommodation for these new residents of Sierra Leone.
 1809 Leicester
 1810 Wilberforce, formerly Cabenda
 1812 Regent
 1816 Gloucester
 1816 Kissy
 1817 Bathurst, formerly Leopold
 1817 Charlotte
 1819 Hastings
 1819 Waterloo
 1819 Wellington
 1829 Murray Town
 1829 Aberdeen

Formation of Sierra Leone Creole people
The Colony-born children of Liberated Africans, the Jamaican Maroons and Nova Scotian Settlers sometimes called the liberated Africans "Willyfoss niggers". Nevertheless, after several decades all three groups developed into the Sierra Leone Creole people who became recognised as a particular ethnic identity alongside others in Sierra Leone.

See also 
Saros (Nigeria)
Sierra Leone Creole people
Creolization
Abolitionism in the United Kingdom
African diaspora

References

Sources 
Johnson U. J. Asiegbu, Slavery and the Politics of Liberation, 1787-1861: A Study of Liberated African Emigration and British Anti-Slavery Policy. Harlow: Longmans, 1969.
https://web.archive.org/web/20071220030942/http://www.urc.org.uk/reform_magazine/articles/clapton/growing.htm
https://web.archive.org/web/20070928135944/http://www.ihaystack.com/authors/h/james_holman/00012528_a_voyage_round_the_world_vol_i_of_/00012528_english_usascii_p005.htm
http://www.yorku.ca/nhp/seminars/seminars/schuler.doc
https://web.archive.org/web/20070709215922/http://www.ehess.fr/centres/ceifr/assr/N117/03.pdf (no longer available)
"History of Creoles of Freetown", AfricaMedia

External links
http://www.slbtbhm.homestead.com/KDY.html
http://www.homestead.com/sierraleoneprayergroupuk/
http://www.slbtbhm.homestead.com/HOME.html

History of Sierra Leone
People of Liberated African descent
Liberated African
+
Sierra Leone–United Kingdom relations
Sierra Leone Colony and Protectorate